Harvey Grossinger is an American short story author and novelist.

Life
He holds a Bachelor of Arts in English from New York University, a Master of Arts from Indiana University, and a Master of Fine Arts from American University.

He teaches at American University, and the University of Maryland, College Park. He is a member of the National Book Critics Circle.  He lives in the Washington, D.C. area.

His work has appeared in New England Review, Mid-American Review, Western Humanities Review, Cimarron Review and many other literary journals.

Awards
 The Quarry, won the Flannery O'Connor Award for Short Fiction in 1997.
The collection also won the Edward Lewis Wallant Award
 Chicago Tribune's Nelson Algren Award
 2006 Dana Award

Works

References

American short story writers
Living people
Year of birth missing (living people)